Kaneh Rashid-e Gol Morad (also Romanized as Kaneh Rashīd-e Gol Morād; also known as Kandrash-e Gol Morād) is a village in Gurani Rural District, Gahvareh District, Dalahu County, Kermanshah Province, Iran. At the 2006 census, its population was 72, in 13 families.

References 

Populated places in Dalahu County